Kilnwood Vale is a village in the Horsham district of West Sussex, England. It borders the High Weald Area of Outstanding Natural Beauty along the A264 east of Faygate between Horsham and Crawley. The development first opened in 2016 which when complete will include 2500 households.

Kilnwood Vale Primary School opened on the development in September 2019 with a planned capacity of 420 pupils. It is a free school and part of the GLF Schools multi academy trust.

Part of The development has a private gym/social club named The Green and the community is supported by its only sports club, Kilnwood Vale Cricket Club which participates in the Sussex Cricket League.

The 23 and 200 Metrobus services connect to Gatwick Airport, Horsham, Crawley and Worthing.

References 

Villages in West Sussex
Horsham District